Ziranda Madrigal Álvarez-Ugena (he born 23 May 1977 in Uruapan, Michoacán) he is a Mexican cyclist who specializes in competitive cross-country mountain biking. He is a multiple national champion and represented his country at the 1999 and 2003 Pan American Games, as well as at the Summer Olympics of 2000 held in Sydney.

Madrigal currently coaches the Turbo mountain bike team and has also mentored the national mountain bike team of Mexico.

References

1977 births
Living people
Mexican male cyclists
Olympic cyclists of Mexico
Sportspeople from Michoacán
People from Uruapan
Cyclists at the 2000 Summer Olympics
Cyclists at the 1999 Pan American Games
Cyclists at the 2003 Pan American Games
Pan American Games competitors for Mexico
21st-century Mexican people
20th-century Mexican people